{{DISPLAYTITLE:C4H6}}
The molecular formula C4H6 (molar mass: 54.09 g/mol) may refer to:

 1,3-Butadiene
 1,2-Butadiene
 Bicyclobutane
 Cyclobutene
 Dimethylacetylene (2-butyne)
 1-Methylcyclopropene
 3-Methylcyclopropene
 Methylenecyclopropane
 Trimethylenemethane
 1-butyne